Ladbroke could refer to:

 Ladbroke, Warwickshire, a village in Warwickshire, England
 Ladbroke Hall, an 18th-century house in Ladbroke
 Ladbroke Black (1877–1940), an English author
 Ladbroke Estate, Notting Hill, West London, England
 Ladbroke Grove, a road and neighbouring area in West London
 Ladbroke Grove rail crash
 Ladbroke Grove tube station
 Ladbroke Square, a garden square in West London
 Ladbrokes Coral, a British gambling company
 Ladbroke (surname)
 Operation Ladbroke, a glider landing during the invasion of Sicily in World War II